Phyllonorycter ostryae is a moth of the family Gracillariidae. It is known from Hokkaidō island of Japan.

The wingspan is 5.5-6.5 mm.

The larvae feed on Ostrya japonica. They mine the leaves of their host plant. The mine has the form of a ptychonomous leaf mine, occurring along the margin on the underside of the leaf.

References

ostryae
Moths of Japan
Moths described in 1963